Albert Christopher Addison (22 April 1862 – 24 May 1935) was an English writer born in 1862 in Northallerton, Yorkshire. In 1868, his father Daniel Addison founded the Tamworth Herald newspaper.

Prison sentence
In September 1896, Addison was sentenced to six months hard labour at the Old Bailey for forging and uttering an order for the payment of £2 5s., with intent to defraud. He was also charged with stealing two spirit levels and other articles of Henry Robert Bicknell, his master.

Bibliography
Books
The Story of the Birkenhead 1902 published  by the Gresham Press Unwin Brothers Ltd 27 Pilgrim Street London E C.

The Boston Guidebook 1923 published by Wing Boston Lincs.
 The Ancient Guildhall: Extract from the "Boston Guide Book" 1930 published by Wing Boston Lincs.
Addison also wrote a book on the Lincolnshire Civil War Period but was never published due to the First World War.

References

External links
 
 
 
 Online book The Romantic Story of the Mayflower Pilgrims 1911.
   A. C. Addison his life story “Lincolnshire Standard and Boston Guardian” 13 June 1931 Subscription required.

1862 births
1935 deaths
English historians
People from Northallerton
English male non-fiction writers